The Dagenham wind turbines are two  high Enercon E-66 and one E-82 wind turbines located on the Dagenham estate of the Ford Motor Company in East London, England. The first two turbines were completed in April 2004 and the third was installed in 2011. They are landmarks of the skyline and the first wind farm to be built in London.

Planning and building
One turbine is located in the London Borough of Barking and Dagenham, (Turbine 1) the second in the Hornchurch Marshes area of the London Borough of Havering (Turbine 2). Planning consent was received from both boroughs. The Mayor of London gave approval for the project in August 2003.

The turbines were constructed by the green energy company Ecotricity. The planned operating date for the third wind turbine was by the first quarter of 2009, and it was eventually installed in 2011.

Specifications

Location

Gallery

References

Buildings and structures in the London Borough of Havering
Buildings and structures in the London Borough of Barking and Dagenham
Wind farms in England
Wind turbines